Yiannis Kouros (born 13 February 1956 in Tripoli, Kingdom of Greece) is a Greek ultramarathon runner based in Greece. He is sometimes given the epithets "Running god", "Pheidippides' Successor" or "Son of Pheidippides". Kouros holds many men's outdoor road world records from 100 to 1,000 miles and many road and track records from 12 hours to 6 days. In 1991, he starred as Pheidippides in the movie The Story of the Marathon: A Hero's Journey, which chronicles the history of marathon running.

Kouros came to prominence when he won the Spartathlon in 1984 in record time and the Sydney to Melbourne Ultramarathon in 1985 in a record time of 5 days, 5 hours, 7 minutes and 6 seconds. He beat the previous record held by Cliff Young. Kouros held Australian citizenship for part of his running career and was inducted into the Australian Ultra Runners Association’s Hall of Fame in 2019.

Concerning the secret of his success, Kouros claims, "when other people get tired, they stop. I don't. I take over my body with my mind. I tell it that it's not tired and it listens."

Kouros has also written over 1,000 poems, several of which appear in his books, Symblegmata ("Clusters") and The Six-Day Run of the Century.

World records
According to the International Association of Ultrarunners, .

Distance

Time races

See also
 Multiday races
 Ultramarathon

References

External links
 Yiannis Kouros official page
 Yiannis Kouros – Greek Greatness

1956 births
Living people
Greek male long-distance runners
Athletes from Tripoli, Greece
Greek ultramarathon runners
Greek male poets
Athletes from Melbourne
Male ultramarathon runners